Daryl Smylie (born 10 September 1985) is a former Northern Irish footballer and current assistant manager of Mariebo IK.

Playing career

Smylie started out playing football for his local Boys Brigade team in Richhill County Armagh. He then started playing for Lurgan Town Boys in the Lisburn league. When he turned 16 he joined the Newcastle United youth academy. During the last two years there he trained with the first team, but failed to make any first team appearances. In the 2005/06 season Smylie spent time on loan at Stockport County where he made his league debut. He joined Scottish First Division club Livingston on a free transfer in the summer of 2006, but was released at the end of the 2006/07 season.

That summer after being released Smylie joined Swedish third-tier club Östersunds FK and played the second half of the 2007 Swedish football Division 1 season. He returned to Östersund the next year and had enough success during the first half of the season to be signed by English manager David Wilson who was in charge of Allsvenskan club Ljungskile SK. The club was relegated at the end of the year but Smylie was signed by another Allsvenskan club, Kalmar FF. However, he struggled for playing time and was loaned out twice to Superettan club Jönköpings Södra until Jönköping finally signed him permanently on a 2+1 year contract at the end of 2011. The club won promotion to Allsvenskan.

On 13 January 2020, Smylie moved to Swedish Division 1 Södra club Assyriska IK.

Coaching career
After retiring from playing, Smylie was appointed as assistant coach of Mariebo IK in 2021.

References

External links 

 
 

1985 births
Expatriate sportspeople from Northern Ireland in Sweden
Expatriate association footballers from Northern Ireland
Association football midfielders
Northern Ireland under-21 international footballers
Association footballers from Northern Ireland
Living people
Livingston F.C. players
Ljungskile SK players
Newcastle United F.C. players
Scottish Football League players
Stockport County F.C. players
Kalmar FF players
Östersunds FK players
Jönköpings Södra IF players
English Football League players
Superettan players
Allsvenskan players
Expatriate footballers in Sweden